The Wake of Dick Johnson is a 2016 theatrical play and feature film produced by Alt Variety and distributed by Amazon. It was written, directed by, and stars Luke H. Walker. The story takes place at the wake of its protagonist Dick Johnson, who returns from death to bitterly ruminate about the afterlife, which according to Johnson is a bleak and endless loop of all the world's agonies. The feature film was adapted for screen from the 2016 off-broadway play––also written by, directed and starring Walker––and produced under the same title.

Plot 
Shortly after his death, Dick Johnson returns from the afterlife to reminisce about drinking, women, and the evils of mankind responsible for the eternal torment his new existence. According to Johnson, death is an alternate universe where the evils of terrestrial life throughout all history "abrade the walls of space-time, leaving behind trillions of minuscule punctures and abrasions in the same way sound is recorded on a vinyl record." In death, Johnson is tormented by the ethereal visage of his long deceased childhood guardian, uncle Willy, a sadistic psychopath who habitually tortured and abused Johnson in extreme and heinous ways throughout his early life. Willy, also played by Walker, appears over static on an antique television throughout the play to torment Johnson and gleefully remind him of his traumas. The two characters interact throughout the duration of the show––at times merging and finishing each other sentences––feeding into the plot that all things are interconnected in the universe "like fibers in a loom." Johnson describes this astral plane as one where only the most heinous evils throughout all time are collected and merge as one; for Johnson it is a tailored version of hell where he and his uncle Willy are inescapably intertwined for all eternity. Acting as a disturbing backdrop, scenes from Disney's Snow White and the Seven Dwarves play throughout the show, acting as a disturbing metronome for the buildup of tension, and with uncanny parallels in narrative.

Play 
The Wake of Dick Johnson first premiered in June 2016 in the basement of Maggie Mae's Pub in Queens, NY. In spring 2019, Walker produced a second full-length run of the play in a small, secluded cabin in Charlotte, North Carolina. It was there the play began to receive attention and received its first formal review by Charlotte-based publication QC Nerve. The publication described the play as "[a] comic, eloquent and upsetting rumination on a meaningless universe where even death will not relieve the pain of living." and cited Walker's "distinctive voice" as "poetic, profane and dark as a starless night."

In October, 2019 The Wake of Dick Johnson returned to New York at Performance Space 122; this time Walker incorporated a live score composed by Asheville, North Carolina-based musical duo Okapi (Lindsey Miller, Scott Gorski). There, the play received yet another laudatory review by Broadwayworld.com, which described the play as "gory," "disturbing," "ghastly," "graphic, and grotesque." The review went on to say "this off-broadway show is gory, freaky, and downright alarming." Broadway World described namesake protagonist, Dick Johnson, as a character you instantly hate, but "relatable in the most chilling way". Time Out New York added The Wake of Dick Johnson to its top-13 list of Halloween events. In December 2019 QC Nerve voted The Wake of Dick Johnson Critic's Pick "Best Of the Year 2019" for best one man show. In 2021, Walker brought the show to Los Angeles for its West Coast premiere at the Hollywood Fringe Festival. The Wake of Dick Johnson received yet more accolades for its fearlessness and originality. Cultural Attaché praised Walker and compared his writing to the late Charles Bukowski. Horror Buzz rallied behind the show, praising the performance and set design and calling Walker a "powerhouse,"  citing the alluring pit of existential dread and beauty in how meaningless and fleeting life is portrayed in the play.

According to an interview on Los Angeles Public Radio, Walker undertook every element of this production in most runs of the play. He designed and built the set by hand, produced it himself, and even devised a series of switches to control lighting, and audio visual cues.

Reception 
Although described as disturbing, grotesque, and highly controversial, to date the play received unanimous critical praise, calling it profound, poetic and fearlessly bleak. It was listed in Time Out New York Top-13 Halloween theater events alongside many world renowned plays such as The Glass Menagerie, Little Shop of Horrors, and Sleep No More.

Cast 
 Luke H. Walker as Dick Johnson
 Luke H. Walker as Uncle Willy

References

External links
 

2016 films
Films about the afterlife
2010s English-language films